Sheikh Noor ul Mashaikh Sayyid Ahamed Muhyudheen NooriShah Jeelani Arabic: (حضرة سيد أحمد محي الدين نوري شاه الجيلاني), known more commonly as NooriShah Jeelani, was a renowned 20th-century muslim, sufi, wali, mystic, orator, faqeeh, theologian, mujaddid and highly acclaimed Islamic scholar of the Qadri, Chisti order from the Indian sub continent. He was the 21st grand son of the famous Sufi saint Ghous-e-Azam Sheikh Mohiyudheen Abdul Qadir Jilani of Baghdad. He was also widely known by his title Noor-ul-Mashaikh. He was the Eponymous founder of the Silsila-e-Nooriya tariqa (Sufi order) which is a sub-branch of Qadiriyya and Chistiyya in India.

His silsila has spread throughout the world influencing millions in more than 40 countries through thousands of his disciples (murid), many gatherings, mosques, Islamic schools, colleges, hospitals and general humanitarian services to society. He was the founder of Kerala’s first Islamic Arabic college Jamia Nooriyya Arabic College, Pattikkad in Malappuram District of Kerala. He accepted the position of vice president of the Jamia Nooriyya Arabic College. Sheikh NooriShah Jeelani was a disciple (murid) of the renowned Sufi saint Sheikh Ghousi Shah whose spiritual master's lineage of predecessors goes to Machiliwale Shah and Mahmoodullah Shah of Hyderabad. His spiritual chain (Tariqa) connects to masters such as Bande Nawaz, Nasiruddin Chiragh Dehlavi, Nizamuddin Auliya, Qutbuddin Bakhtiar Kaki, Moinuddin Chishti of Chishti Order as well as masters such as Abdul Qadir Gilani, Junayd of Baghdad, Sari al-Saqati, Maruf Kharkhi of Qadiri order.

Sheikh NooriShah Jeelani received the title of Caliph (or religious successors) from his spiritual teacher Sheikh Kanzul Irfan Moulana Ghousi Shah of Hyderabad, India after years of spiritual training under his guidance. His ʿUrs (anniversary of death) is celebrated on 14th day of month Rabiʽ al-Thani (Islamic calendar). His mausoleum (or tomb) Dargah is located in very well known place called Noori Maskan of Noori Nagar in the Bandlaguda area of Hyderabad, Telangana, India.

While Sheikh NooriShah Jeelani had millions of disciples (students or murids), few of them were given Caliph and made Khalifa (or religious successors) of his religious spiritual chain and continued to spread the knowledge of Sufism and Spirituality. Among his senior Khalifa (or religious successors) who later became very well acclaimed and most renowned Sufi Saints in the Indian Sub-continent include Sheikh Syed Arifuddin Jeelani Noorullah Shah Noori, Sheikh Syed Muneeruddin Jeelani Kamalullah Shah Noori, Sheikh Syed Nasiruddin Jeelani Asrarullah Shah Noori,
Sheikh Yousuf Zuhoori Shah Noori,
Khwaja Dil Nawaz Faizee Shah Noori,
Khwaja Faqeer Nawaz Aamir Kaleemi Shah Noori,
Sheikh Jamali Shah Noori, Sheikh Noorul Ulama Ibrahim Khaleelullah Shah Noori,
Sheikh Muhibbi Shah Noori,
Sheikh Yaqoob Ali Shah Noori, Sheikh Syed Aziz Ali Shah Noori (mamujaan) among others.
These Sufi saints later spread their knowledge across more than 20 different countries mainly in the Indian Sub-continent, Middle East and South East Asian countries.

Silsila-e-Nooriya

The present Janasheen of Silsila-e-Nooiyya and Sajjada Nasheen Rouza-e-Nooriyya Sheikh Noorul Irfan Kanzul Mashaeq Sayyid Ahmad Muhyadheen Noori Shah Saani Jeelani (Damat Barakatuhum), (Sajjada Nasheen Silsila Nooriya & Sajjada Nasheen Rouza-e-Nooriyya wa Rouza-e-Arifiyya ) He is 23rd generation of Ghouz-E-Azam Sheikh Mohiuddin Abdul Qadir Jilani (RA), a famous Sufi saint of Baghdad, He is the grandson of Shaikh Noorul Mashaeq Sayyid Ahmad Muhyadheen Noori Shah Jilani (RA) and the eldest son of Sheikh Quthubul Mashaeq Sayyid Arifudheen Jilani (RA). Hazrat Noorul Irfan Kanzul Mashaeq Sayyid Ahmad Muhyadheen Noori Shah Saani Jeelani (db)(Janasheen Silsila e Nooria & Sajjada Nasheen Rouza e Nooria) is currently leading all the Urs programs of Sheikh NooriShah.

Selected works 

Sheikh NooriShah Jeelani was known to have authored multiple books of Islamic spirituality. Some of the works published in Indian sub-continent were as follows:-

Spiritual chain 

The chain of spiritual masters (silsila) of Nooriya reaches both Qadriya and Chistiya masters, hence it came to be known as Chisti-ul-Qadiri . Sheikh NooriShah Jeelani's spiritual preachings continued to influence millions of common people across more than 40 countries with the following major sub-branches:

Silsila-e-Arifiya Nooriya was led by his own first son and Khalifa called Sheikh Qutb-ul-Mashaikh Noorullah Shah Noori (also known as Syed Arifudheen Jeelani). He was the Sajjada Janasheen of Silsila-e-Nooriya. He is thus 22'nd Grand Son of Sheikh Abdul Qadir Gilani. Sheikh Syed Muhammed Arifudheen Jeelani died on 13th March 2022 (10th Sha'aban 1443) in Al Arif Unani Medical College, Hyderabad and which was built by himself. His Urs (anniversary of death) is celebrated on 10th day of month of Sha'ban (Islamic calendar). The Present Janasheen of Silsila-e-Arifiyya Nooriya and Silsila-e-Nooia is Sheikh Syed Arifudheen Jeelani's own eldest son Kanzul Mashaeq Sheikh Syed Ahmed Muhyudheen NooriShah Saani Jeelani (Damath Barakathuhum). He is The Present Janasheen of Silsila-e-Nooriyya and Sajjada Nasheen Rouza-e-Nooriyya. Sheikh Kanzul Mashaeq NooriShah Saani currently leads all Urs celebrations of Sheikh NooriShah Jeelani at Noori Maskan in Hyderabad.
Silsila-e-Kamaliya Nooriya led by his own son and Khalifa called Sheikh Syed Kamalullah Shah Noori (also known as Syed Mohammed Muneeruddin Jeelani) whose Mausoleum (or Tomb) is inside the same complex (Tomb) of Sheikh NooriShah Jeelani at Hyderabad, India
Silsila-e-Asrariya Nooriya is led by his own son and Khalifa called Sheikh Mumtaz-ul-Mashaikh Rooh-ul-Irfan Kanz-ul-Asrar Syed Asrarullah Shah Noori (also known as Syed Mohammed Nasiruddin Jeelani) (Damath Barakathuhum). He has been contributing continuously to the academics of Islamic sciences being in teaching positions of Sufi philosophy, Hadees and Quran Tafseer in the famous Jamia Nizamia University of Hyderabad in India.
Silsila-e-Zuhooriya Nooriya was led by his Khalifa called Sheikh Muballigh-ul-Ihsan wa Musahhihu Ta'aleemath Zuhoori Shah Noori Chisti-ul-Qadiri whose Mausoleum (or Tomb) is at Karuvarakundu area, Malappuram district in Kerala, India. His Urs (anniversary of death) is celebrated on 7th day of month of Rabi`-ul-Akhir (Islamic calendar).
Silsila-e-Faizeeya Nooriya was led by his Khalifa called Sheikh Shams-ul-Aarifeen Qutb-ul-Aqtab Khwaja Dil Nawaz Faizee Shah Noori Chisti-ul-Qadiri whose Mausoleum (or Tomb) is at Lalpet Dargah, Cuddalore District of Tamil Nadu, India. His Urs (anniversary of death) is celebrated on 20th day of month of Rajab (Islamic calendar).
Silsila-e-Aamiria Nooriya was led by his Khalifa called Sheikh Shams-ul-Mufassireen Khwaja Faqeer Nawaz Syed Muhammad Umar Aamir Kaleemi Shah Noori Chisti-ul-Qadiri Al Hasani ul Hussaini Jafari ul Jeelani whose Mausoleum (or Tomb) is at GGA Pannur Dargah, Sunguvarchatram area, 60 km from Chennai District of Tamil Nadu, India. He was also known to be 30th grand son of Ghous-e-Azam Sheikh Abdul Qadir Jilani. His Urs (anniversary of death) is celebrated on 29th day of month of Muharram (Islamic calendar).
Silsila-e-Khaleeliya Nooriya was led by his Khalifa called Sheikh Noorul Ulama  Ibraheem Khaleelulla Shah Noori Chisti-ul-Qadiri whose Mausoleum (or Tomb) is at Parappuram area in Kerala, India
Silsila-e-Ameeriya Nooriya was led by his Khalifa called Sheikh Ganj-ul-Marifat Shams-ul-Aarifeen Siraj-us-Saalikeen Ameerullah Shah Noori Chisti-ul-Qadiri whose Mausoleum (or Tomb) is at Sangareddy Dargah in Sangareddy District of Telangana, India. His Urs (anniversary of death) is celebrated on 28th day of month of Shawwal (Islamic calendar).
Silsila-e-Jamaliya Nooriya was led by his Khalifa called Sheikh Jamal-ul-Aarifeen Hujjath-ul-Irfan Jamali Shah Noori Chisti-ul-Qadiri whose Mausoleum (or Tomb) is at Ayangudi Dargah in Kattumannarkoil of Cuddalore District of Tamil Nadu, India

Silsila-e-Yaqoobia Nooriya is led by his Khalifa called Sheikh Nagam-ul-Aarifeen Mohammad Yaqoob Ali Shah Noori Chisti-ul-Qadiri (Damath barakatuhum) which is actively spreading knowledge of Sufism and spiritual training in Telangana, Andhra Pradesh and Kerala in India
Silsila-e-Nizamiya Nooriya is led by his Khalifa called Sheikh Syed Nizami Shah Noori Chisti-ul-Qadiri (Damath barakatuhum) which is actively spreading knowledge of Sufism and spiritual training in Pondicherry and Tamil Nadu in India

Related 
 Mahmoodullah Shah
 Machiliwale Shah
 Kareemullah Shah
 Ghousi Shah
Bande Nawaz
Nasiruddin Chiragh Dehlavi
Nizamuddin Auliya
Moinuddin Chishti
Abdul Qadir Gilani
Ibn Arabi
Maulana Rumi

References

External links 
Silsila Nooriyya
Rowdha Nooriyya satellite view
Al Arif Unani Medical Research Centre & Hospital – Hyderabad (Free Check up & Treatment)
SUFISM: SILSILA NOORIYYA PHOTOS OF (HAZRAT QIBLA)
Gyarvi Sharif
Gausi Shah
Silsila e Kamaliya

Indian Sufi saints
1915 births
1990 deaths

id:Tarekat Qodiriyah